Public bodies of the Scottish Government are organisations that are funded by the Scottish Government. They form a tightly meshed network of executive and advisory non-departmental public bodies ("quangoes"); tribunals; and nationalised industries. Such public bodies are distinct from executive agencies of the Scottish Government, as unlike them they are not considered to be part of the Government and staff of public bodies are not civil servants, although executive agencies are listed in the Scottish Government's directory of national public bodies alongside other public bodies.

Governance

The Scottish Government is responsible for appointing a board of directors to run public bodies. The Office of the Commissioner for Public Appointments in Scotland is responsible for regulating the process.

Public bodies are assigned "sponsoring departments" who provide funding in the form of grant-in-aid to assist with running costs and capital investment. Most public bodies also have other sources of income (for example the Royal Botanic Garden Edinburgh receives income from charging the public to visit the greenhouses in its gardens).

List of public bodies

Non-ministerial offices
Non-ministerial offices are staffed by civil servants, but do not form part of the Scottish Government. They are accountable to, and funded by the Scottish Parliament, and publish their own annual reports and accounts. Each office is headed by a board or statutory officeholder(s) appointed by the Scottish Government.

Consumer Scotland
Environmental Standards Scotland
Food Standards Scotland
National Records of Scotland
Office of the Scottish Charity Regulator
Registers of Scotland
Revenue Scotland
Scottish Courts and Tribunals Service
Scottish Fiscal Commission
Scottish Housing Regulator

Executive non-departmental public bodies
Executive NDPBs carry out work on behalf of government but do not form part of it, nor are they directly accountable to parliament.  They operate within a framework of governance and accountability set by Ministers; often this is defined in specific legislation setting up each body. They employ their own staff, who are not civil servants.
Accounts Commission for Scotland 
Architecture and Design Scotland
Bòrd na Gàidhlig
Cairngorms National Park Authority
Care Inspectorate
Children's Hearings Scotland
Community Justice Scotland
Creative Scotland
Crofting Commission
David MacBrayne Ltd
Ferguson Marine (Port Glasgow) Ltd
Highlands and Islands Airports Ltd
Highlands and Islands Enterprise
Historic Environment Scotland
Independent Living Fund Scotland
The Loch Lomond and the Trossachs National Park Authority
National Galleries of Scotland
National Library of Scotland 
National Museums Scotland
NatureScot
Police Investigations and Review Commissioner
Quality Meat Scotland
Redress Scotland
Risk Management Authority 
Royal Botanic Garden Edinburgh 
Scottish Agricultural Wages Board
Scottish Canals
Scottish Children's Reporter Administration
Scottish Criminal Cases Review Commission
Scottish Enterprise
Scottish Environment Protection Agency
Scottish Funding Council
Scottish Futures Trust
Scottish Land Commission
Scottish Legal Aid Board
Scottish Legal Complaints Commission
Scottish National Investment Bank
Scottish Qualifications Authority
Scottish Rail Holdings
Scottish Social Services Council
Skills Development Scotland
South of Scotland Enterprise
sportscotland
VisitScotland
Water Industry Commission for Scotland

Advisory non-departmental public bodies
Advisory NDPBs are similar to Executive NDPBs, but do not undertake activities directly. They provide independent expert advice to the government and others in relation to particular subject. They do not normally employ staff, with administrative support usually being provided by civil servants.
Boundaries Scotland
Judicial Appointments Board for Scotland
Mobility and Access Committee for Scotland
Poverty and Inequality Commission for Scotland
Scottish Advisory Committee on Distinction Awards
Scottish Commission on Social Security
Scottish Fuel Poverty Advisory Panel
Scottish Law Commission

Tribunals
Tribunals undertake judicial functions, but do not form part of the court system. They are independent of government, and are not responsible for budgets or expenditure other than remuneration for tribunal members.
First-tier Tribunal for Scotland
Parole Board for Scotland
Upper Tribunal for Scotland

Public corporations
Public corporations are companies which recover more than 50% of their costs through commercial activities. They are managed by a board whose members are appointed by the government. Public corporations employ their own staff (who are not civil servants) and manage their own budgets. 
Caledonian Maritime Assets Ltd
Crown Estate Scotland
Glasgow Prestwick Airport
Scottish Water

Executive agencies
Executive agencies form part of the Scottish Government, but have a specific, well-defined remit. They are staffed by civil servants and headed by a Chief Executive, who is a civil servant, and are directly accountable to the government.
Accountant in Bankruptcy
Disclosure Scotland
Education Scotland
Forestry and Land Scotland
Scottish Forestry
Scottish Prison Service
Scottish Public Pensions Agency
Social Security Scotland
Student Awards Agency for Scotland
Transport Scotland

Commissioners and ombudsmen
Commissioners and ombudsmen are responsible for monitoring the actions of government and public boards. They are responsible to parliament, and appointed by the Scottish Parliamentary Corporate Body, in order to ensure their independence from government.
Commissioner for Ethical Standards in Public Life
Scotland's Commissioner For Children and Young People
Scottish Biometrics Commissioner
Scottish Human Rights Commission
Scottish Information Commissioner
Scottish Public Services Ombudsman
Standards Commission for Scotland

Health bodies
NHS Ayrshire and Arran
NHS Borders
NHS Dumfries and Galloway
NHS Fife
NHS Forth Valley
NHS Grampian
NHS Greater Glasgow and Clyde
NHS Highland
NHS Lanarkshire
NHS Lothian
NHS Orkney
NHS Shetland
NHS Tayside
NHS Western Isles
Healthcare Improvement Scotland
Mental Welfare Commission for Scotland
National Waiting Times Centre Board
NHS 24
NHS Education for Scotland
NHS National Services Scotland
Public Health Scotland
Scottish Ambulance Service Board
State Hospital Board for Scotland

Other significant national bodies
Audit Scotland
Convener of School Closure Review Panels 
Court of the Lord Lyon 
Drinking Water Quality Regulator
HM Chief Inspector of Prisons for Scotland 
HM Chief Inspector of Prosecution in Scotland
HM Fire Service Inspectorate in Scotland 
HM Inspector of Constabulary for Scotland 
Justices of the Peace Advisory Committee (x6)
Office of the Queen's Printer for Scotland 
Scottish Fire and Rescue Service
Scottish Police Authority 
Scottish Road Works Commissioner

References

External links
Directory of national public bodies - Scottish Government
Online database of all UK quangos 1998-2006 from the Economic Research Council